Lonnie Mack "Macky" Carden (born February 12, 1944) is a former American football coach.  He serve as head football at Elon University from 1984 to 1988, compiling a record of 34–17 Carden also served as the wrestling coach at Elon.  He was inducted into the Elon Sports Hall of Fame in 2008.

Head coaching record

References

1944 births
Elon Phoenix football coaches
College wrestling coaches in the United States
Living people